John Terence Woodgate (11 December 1919 – 26 April 1985) was an English footballer who played for West Ham United and Peterborough United as a winger.

Born in East Ham, Essex (now part of London), Woodgate was at home on either wing. He made his Second Division debut before World War II, against Bradford Park Avenue on 7 April 1939. During World War II Woodgate served with the Essex Regiment and the Royal Artillery. Woodgate gained a regular place in the Hammers team after the war and was ever-present during the 1950–51 season. He went on to make 275 appearances for the east London club, scoring 52 goals. He scored a hat-trick in seven minutes against Plymouth Argyle in 1946.

With emerging competition from Harry Hooper and Malcolm Musgrove, Woodgate left West Ham to join Peterborough United in March 1954. He subsequently played for March Town United.

After finishing his football career he became the landlord of the Cock Inn Public House in March, Cambridgeshire. Woodgate died 26 April 1985.

References

External links

West Ham Player List

1919 births
1982 deaths
Military personnel from Essex
Footballers from East Ham
English footballers
Association football wingers
West Ham United F.C. players
Peterborough United F.C. players
March Town United F.C. players
English Football League players
British Army personnel of World War II
Publicans
Essex Regiment soldiers
Royal Artillery personnel